Muzaffarpur Lok Sabha constituency is one of the 40 Lok Sabha (parliamentary) constituencies in the Indian state of Bihar.

Vidhan Sabha segments

Members of Lok Sabha

^ by-poll

Election results

Lok Sabha Election 2019

General Election 2014

Lok Sabha Election 2009

Lok Sabha Election 1980
 George Fernandes (Janata Party - Secular) : 195,510 votes  
 Digvijay Narayan Singh (Janata Party) : 172,401 votes 
 Congress in third place. Rajani Saha : 66,744

Lok Sabha Election 1977
 George Fernandes (Janata Party) : 396,687 votes (78.23%)
 Nitishwer Prasad Singh (Congress) : 62470 (12.32%). Lost by 334,217 votes.
 Ramdeo Sharma (CPI) : 26,408

References

See also
 Muzaffarpur district
 List of Constituencies of the Lok Sabha

Lok Sabha constituencies in Bihar
Politics of Muzaffarpur district